The Armed Forces Academies Preparatory School or AFAPS (Thai: โรงเรียนเตรียมทหาร) is a senior high school in Nakhon Nayok Province. It is a flagship institution of the Royal Thai Armed Forces Headquarters. The curriculum consists of academic and physical training as well as other activities. Cadets who manage to graduate automatically gain entrance to the Chulachomklao Royal Military Academy, the Royal Thai Naval Academy, the Royal Thai Air Force Academy, or the Royal Thai Police Academy.

The school accepts only male applicants. Admission to AFAPS is selective. The number of applicants per year exceeds 70,000 and over 600 are accepted, making overall acceptance rate less than 1%. With more than 600 cadets per class year, the academy's enrolment is around 2,000. The cadet regiment represents all provinces of Thailand. The academy supports the traditions and ceremonies of Buddhist, Muslim, and Christian students.

The school has a reputation for producing close lifelong bonds between the pre-cadets of each class. Rivalries between classes are common, especially in the promotion process. One of the root causes of the 1991 Thai coup d'état was classmate conflict between Class 5 and Class 7.

History

The Thai Ministry of Defence established the Armed Forces Academies Preparatory School, literally in Thai language 'Prepare for Military', on 27 January 1958 by consolidating the preparatory schools of the Royal Thai Army, Navy, and Air Force. It was formerly next to Lumphini Park in Bangkok, (the current site of the "One Bangkok" ). In 2000, the academy moved to a new 4 km2 site in Nakhon Nayok Province.

Academics 

In last two years program for a senior high school level, AFAPS provides a rigorous academic program, with a focus on science, mathematics, and pre-engineering courses. Cadets study academics for four days a week in academic buildings from 08:00 to 16:00. On designated training days, study time is divided in half. In the morning, a wide range of sport and health education classes (i.e., rugby, track and field, fencing, paramedic swimming, etc.) are offered. In the afternoon, cadets study military science and strategies, including military structure, field survival, and weapon training.

AFAPS provides courses in English, Chinese, mathematics (through algebra and calculus), history and social science, laboratory science, art, music, and religious studies. Cadets may also choose to join club programs such as marching band, exhibition drill, poetry, and sports.

Evening classes are offered to students in Olympiad programs and as optional learning opportunities.

Grade point average (GPA) is measured on a 4.0 scale. Cadets are ranked academically.

Sports

Long distance running 
Cadets run about five kilometres each morning and more than 10 kilometres each afternoon. AFAPS encourages cadets to compete in marathons, and many win awards each year. In-school 10 kilometre mini-marathons are hosted every month.

Swimming 
AFAPS has two indoor swimming pools, one 50 meter pool and one 25 meter pool. Cadets are trained to swim long distances and in paramedic swimming. One of the tests is a four kilometre swim which every cadet must pass to graduate. AFAPS hosts one of the biggest annual swimming competitions in Thailand.

Research 
AFAPS is the only secondary school in Thailand to support military research. The policy allows personnel and cadets to study a wide range of military subjects, such as military technology, physical training, and military psychology. The most famous and considered the main research program is military technology. The Mechatronic Club is largely responsible for this area of research. AFAPS works with both other military departments and private agencies on various local and national research projects to forge innovations in science and technology that can benefit the Thai military.

The Mechatronic club has a reputation of developing award-winning military robots that serve different purposes. In 2013, one cadet project was research on the effectiveness of camouflage. This project is now being studied by the armed forces. In 2014, an AFAPS research team created a laser-guided shooting practice system and an automatic food crops system.

Notable alumni
 Chalermchai Sitthisart
 Itthaporn Subhawong

AFAPS Class 1
 Chavalit Yongchaiyudh
 Sunthorn Kongsompong
 Surayud Chulanont

AFAPS Class 5
 Arthit Kamlang-ek
 Chaiyasit Shinawatra
 Isarapong Noonpakdee
 Kaset Rojananil
 Ruangroj Mahasaranon
 Suchinda Kraprayoon

AFAPS Class 6
 Chalit Pukbhasuk
 Kowit Wattana
 Prawit Wongsuwan
 Sonthi Boonyaratglin

AFAPS Class 7
 Chamlong Srimuang
 Manoonkrit Roopkachorn
 Pallop Pinmanee
 Sanan Kachornprasart
 Saprang Kalayanamitr

AFAPS Class 10
 Anupong Paochinda
 Songkitti Jaggabatara
 Thaksin Shinawatra

AFAPS Class 12
 Prayut Chan-o-cha
 Thanasak Patimaprakorn

AFAPS Class 20
 Apirat Kongsompong
 Manat Wongwat
 Suwat Jangyodsuk

References

External links

http://www.afaps.ac.th Armed Forces Academies Preparatory School

 
Military education and training in Thailand
Schools in Thailand
Educational institutions established in 1958
Military of Thailand
Ministry of Defence (Thailand)
1958 establishments in Thailand